PFB or pfb may refer to:

 Perfluorobutane, a fluorocarbon gas
 Printer Font Binary, a binary PostScript font file
 Pseudofolliculitis barbae, a medical term for persistent inflammation caused by shaving
 Lauro Kurtz Airport (IATA code), near Passo Fundo, Brazil